Boro Drašković (born 29 May 1935) is a Serbian director, playwright and screenwriter.

Biography 
Boro Drašković graduated from Belgrade's Academy of Theater, Film, Radio, and Television in 1959. He entered the film industry as an assistant to Polish director Andrzej Wajda in 1962 and afterwards became an assistant to Jerzy Kawalerowicz. Drašković sold his first screenplay in 1964. Horoskop (Horoscope), released in 1969, was Drašković's first feature film. Three more feature films followed, which he also co-scripted. Drašković has directed documentaries and worked in television and radio; he has also written several books on cinema and theater. 

He received a doctorate honoris causa from the École supérieure de réalisation audiovisuelle in 2010.

Filmography

Television

Film

Awards and nominations

Books
 Promena (Change), 1975.
 Ogledalo (Mirror), Svjelost, Sarajevo, 1985.
 Lavirint (Labyrinth), Sterijino pozorje, Novi Sad, 1980. 
 Paradoks o reditelju (The Paradox of the Director), Sterijino pozorje, Novi Sad, 1988.
 Kralj majmuna (Monkey King), Prometheus – Novi Sad, 1996.
 Pogled Prolaznika (A View of Passers), Prometheus – Novi Sad, 2006, 
 Ravnoteža (Balance) Vršac, 2007, 
 Fillm o Filmu (A Film about Film), Prometheus – Novi Sad, 2010, 
 Krug maslinom (Olive Circle), Novi Sad, Theater Museum of Vojvodina, 2011, 
 Drama reditelja (Drama of Director), Vršac, 2011, 
 Kamus profesije (Dictionary of the Profession), Knjaževsko-srpski teatar, Kragujevac, 2012,

See also 
 List of Serbian submissions for the Academy Award for Best Foreign Language Film
 1997 Toronto International Film Festival
 Big Golden Arena for Best Film
 Statuette of Joakim Vujić

References

External links 

Boro Draskovic

Wordpress Boro i Maja Drašković

20th-century Serbian male actors
21st-century Serbian male actors
20th-century Serbian writers
21st-century Serbian writers
1935 births
Living people
People from Sarajevo
Serbian people of Bosnia and Herzegovina descent
Serbs of Bosnia and Herzegovina
Serbian screenwriters
Male screenwriters
Serbian theatre directors
Serbian television directors
Serbian film directors
Film people from Sarajevo
Serbian male actors
Serbian male stage actors
Serbian male television actors
Serbian male voice actors
Serbian male film actors